Altemir is a given name. Notable people with the name include:

Altemir Gregolin (born 1964), Brazilian veterinarian and politician
Altemir Cordeiro Pessôa Neto or Neto Pessoa (born 1994), Brazilian footballer